Echidna is a genus of moray eels in the family Muraenidae.

Description
Echidna species lack canine teeth.

Diet
They generally eat crustaceans.

Species
, FishBase and WoRMS recognize the following eleven species in Echidna:

 Echidna amblyodon (Bleeker, 1856) (Sulawesi moray)
 Echidna catenata (Bloch, 1795) (chain moray)
 Echidna delicatula (Kaup, 1856) (mottled moray)
 Echidna leucotaenia L. P. Schultz, 1943 (whiteface moray)
 Echidna nebulosa (J. N. Ahl, 1789) (snowflake moray)
 Echidna nocturna (Cope, 1872) (freckled moray)
 Echidna peli (Kaup, 1856) (pebbletooth moray)
 Echidna polyzona (J. Richardson, 1845) (barred moray)
 Echidna rhodochilus Bleeker, 1863 (pink-lipped moray eel)
 Echidna unicolor L. P. Schultz, 1953 (unicolor moray)
 Echidna xanthospilos (Bleeker, 1859) (New Guinea moray)

In addition to the species listed above, the zebra moray (Gymnomuraena zebra) has sometimes been included in Echidna.

References

Muraenidae
 
Taxa named by Johann Reinhold Forster